Plato Gus Andrecopoulos (November 28, 1921 – September 22, 2008) was a college All-American and professional football player. A 6'0", 240 lbs. guard from the University of Oklahoma, Andros spent four years in the United States Coast Guard fighting German submarines before coming back to earn All-American honors as a Sooner in 1946. He played four years in the National Football League for the Chicago Cardinals, from 1947 to 1950. Plato's brother, Dee Andros, was also a star lineman at Oklahoma and later served as the head football coach and athletic director at Oregon State University.

References

External links

1921 births
2008 deaths
American football guards
Chicago Cardinals players
Oklahoma Sooners football players
United States Coast Guard personnel of World War II
Sportspeople from Oklahoma City
Players of American football from Oklahoma
American people of Greek descent